All Is Possible in Granada (Spanish: Todo es posible en Granada) is a 1982 Spanish musical comedy film directed by Rafael Romero Marchent and starring Manolo Escobar, Tessa Hood and Manolo Gómez Bur. The film's sets were designed by the art director Luis Vázquez. It is a remake of the 1954 film of the same name.

Cast
 Manolo Escobar as Manolo Ortega 
 Tessa Hood as Margaret 
 Manolo Gómez Bur as José Heredia Jiménez 'Petaca' 
 Luis Varela as Roby 
 Rafael Alonso as Mr. Taylor 
 Luis Barbero as Falsificador 
 Félix Dafauce as Mr. Colman 
 José Moreno
 Francisco Nieto
 Emilio Fornet as Curro 
 Rafael Romero Marchent as Camarero

References

Bibliography
 José Luis Borau. Palabra de cine: su presencia en nuestro lenguaje. Ediciones Península, 2010.

External links 

1982 films
1980s musical comedy films
Spanish musical comedy films
1980s Spanish-language films
Films directed by Rafael Romero Marchent
Remakes of Spanish films
1982 comedy films
1980s Spanish films